Kirovsky District is an administrative and municipal district (raion), one of the twenty-four in Kaluga Oblast, Russia. It is located in the southwest part of the oblast. Its administrative center is the town of Kirov. Population:   7,118 (2002 Census);  The population of Kirov accounts for 73.2% of the district's population.

References

Notes

Sources

Districts of Kaluga Oblast